Prolyncestis is a monotypic moth genus of the family Erebidae. Its only species, Prolyncestis biplagiata, is found on Madagascar. Both the genus and species were first described by Viette in 1971.

References

Calpinae
Monotypic moth genera